Morne Diablotins is the highest mountain in Dominica, an island-nation in the Caribbean Lesser Antilles. It is the second highest mountain in the Lesser Antilles, after La Grande Soufrière in Guadeloupe. It is located within Morne Diablotin National Park.

The mountain is volcanic, and last erupted c. 30,000 years ago.  There are no known historical eruptions. The source of the Toulaman River lies in the mountain area.

Morne Diablotins shares its name with the local term for the rare black-capped petrel (Pterodroma hasitata).

See also
 List of mountains of Dominica
 List of volcanoes in Dominica

References

Mountains of Dominica
Volcanoes of Dominica
Mountains of the Caribbean
VEI-6 volcanoes
Pleistocene stratovolcanoes
Inactive volcanoes
Highest points of countries